This is a shortened version of the eleventh chapter of the ICD-9: Complications of Pregnancy, Childbirth, and the Puerperium. It covers ICD codes 630 to 679. The full chapter can be found on pages 355 to 378 of Volume 1, which contains all (sub)categories of the ICD-9. Volume 2 is an alphabetical index of Volume 1. Both volumes can be downloaded for free from the website of the World Health Organization.

Ectopic and molar pregnancy (630–633)
  Hydatidiform mole
  Other abnormal product of conception
  Abortion, missed
  Ectopic pregnancy, tubal, no IUP
  Ectopic pregnancy, no IUP, unspec.

Other pregnancy with abortive outcome (634–639)
  Spontaneous abortion
  Legally induced abortion
  Illegally induced abortion
  Unspecified abortion
  Failed attempted abortion
  Complications following abortion and ectopic and molar pregnancies

Complications mainly related to pregnancy (640–649)
  Hemorrhage in early pregnancy
  Threatened abortion
  Abortion, threatened, antepartum
  Antepartum hemorrhage, abruptio placentae, and placenta previa
  Placenta previa, w/o bleeding, unspec.
  Placenta previa, w/ bleeding, unspec.
  Abruptio placentae, unspec.
  Hemorrhage in pregnancy., unspec.
  Hypertension complicating pregnancy, childbirth, and the puerperium
  Benign essential hypertension complicating pregnancy childbirth and the puerperium
  Hypertension secondary to renal disease complicating pregnancy childbirth and the puerperium
  Other pre-existing hypertension complicating pregnancy childbirth and the puerperium
  Transient hypertension of pregnancy
  Gestational hypertension, antepartum
  Mild or unspecified pre-eclampsia
  Severe pre-eclampsia
  Eclampsia, unspec.
  Pre-eclampsia or eclampsia superimposed on pre-existing hypertension
  Excessive vomiting in pregnancy
  Mild hyperemesis gravidarum
  Hyperemesis gravidarum with metabolic disturbance
  Vomiting of pregnancy, unspec.
  Early or threatened labor
  Threatened premature labor
  Other threatened labor
  Early onset of delivery
  Prolonged pregnancy
  Post term pregnancy
  Prolonged pregnancy
  Other complications of pregnancy, not elsewhere classified
  Papyraceous fetus
  Edema or excessive weight gain in pregnancy without mention of hypertension
  Unspecified renal disease in pregnancy without mention of hypertension
  Habitual aborter currently pregnant
  Peripheral neuritis in pregnancy
  Asymptomatic bacteriuria in pregnancy
  Infections of genitourinary tract in pregnancy
  Liver disorders in pregnancy
  Infective and parasitic conditions in the mother classifiable
  Syphilis complicating pregnancy childbirth or the puerperium
  Gonorrhea complicating pregnancy childbirth or the puerperium
  Other venereal diseases complicating pregnancy childbirth or the puerperium
  Tuberculosis complicating pregnancy childbirth or the puerperium
  Malaria complicating pregnancy childbirth or the puerperium
  Rubella complicating pregnancy childbirth or the puerperium
  Other viral diseases complicating pregnancy childbirth or the puerperium
  Other current conditions in the mother classifiable elsewhere
  Diabetes mellitus complicating pregnancy childbirth or the puerperium
  Thyroid dysfunction complicating pregnancy childbirth or the puerperium
  Anemia complicating pregnancy childbirth or the puerperium
  Drug dependence complicating pregnancy childbirth or the puerperium
  Mental disorders complicating pregnancy childbirth or the puerperium
  Congenital cardiovascular disorders complicating pregnancy childbirth or the puerperium
  Other cardiovascular diseases complicating pregnancy childbirth or the puerperium
  Bone and joint disorders of back pelvis and lower limbs of mother complicating pregnancy childbirth or the puerperium
  Abnormal glucose tolerance of mother complicating pregnancy childbirth or the puerperium
  Gestational diabetes, antepartum
  Other current conditions complicating pregnancy childbirth or the puerperium
  Other conditions or status of the mother complicating pregnancy, childbirth, or the puerperium
  Tobacco use disorder complicating pregnancy, childbirth, or the puerperium
  Obesity complicating pregnancy, childbirth, or the puerperium
  Bariatric surgerystatus complicating pregnancy, childbirth, or the puerperium
  Coagulation defects complicating pregnancy, childbirth, or the puerperium
  Epilepsy complicating pregnancy, childbirth, or the puerperium
  Spotting complicating pregnancy
  Uterine size date discrepancy
  Cervical shortening

Normal delivery, and other indications for care in pregnancy, labor, and delivery (650–659)
  Normal delivery
  Multiple gestation
  Twins, unspec.
  Triplets, unspec.
  Malposition and malpresentation of fetus
  Disproportion
  Abnormality of organs and soft tissues of pelvis
  Known or suspected fetal abnormality affecting management of mother
  Fetal movements, decreased, antepartum
  Other fetal and placental problems affecting management of mother
  Fetal-maternal hemorrhage affecting management of mother
  Rh incompatibility, delivered
  Fetal distress, delivered
  Small-for-dates, antepartum
  Large-for-dates, delivered
  Polyhydramnios
  Other problems associated with amniotic cavity and membranes
  Oligohydramnios
  Oligohydramnios, antepartum
  Premature rupture of membrane, unspec.
  Other problems associated with amniotic cavity and membranes
 Amniotic band syndrome
  Other indications for care or intervention related to labor
  Induction of labor, failed
  Abnormality in fetal heart rate/rhythm

Complications occurring mainly in the course of labor and delivery (660–669)
  Obstructed labor
  Obstruction, malposition, delivered
  Obstruction, bony pelvis, delivered
  Shoulder dystocia, delivered
  Locked twins, delivered
  Trial of labor, failed, delivered
  Abnormality of forces of labor
  Uterine inertia, primary, unspec.
  Uterine inertia, secondary, unspec.
  Labor, precipitate, unspec.
  Long labor
  Labor, prolonged, unspec.
  Umbilical cord complications
  Cord around neck, unspec.
  Cord entanglement, other and unspec.
  Trauma to perineum and vulva during delivery
  Laceration, perineal, 1st deg., postpartum
  Laceration, perineal, 2nd deg., postpartum
  Laceration, perineal, 3rd deg., postpartum
  Laceration, perineal, 4th deg., postpartum
  Other obstetrical trauma
  Laceration of cervix, unspec.
  Postpartum hemorrhage
  Hemorrhage, 3rd stage, postpartum
  Hemorrhage, other immediate postpartum
  Retained placenta or membranes, without hemorrhage
  Complication (medicine) of the administration of anesthetic or other sedation in labor (childbirth) and delivery
  Complication (medicine) Other complications of labor and delivery, not elsewhere classified
  Forceps delivery or vacuum extractor delivery without mention of indication
  Forceps/vacuum extractor delivery, delivered, with or without mention of antepartum condition
  Cesarean delivery without mention of indication
  Cesarean delivery without indication unspecified as to episode of care
  Cesarean delivery without indication delivered with or without antepartum condition
  Other Complication (medicine) of labor (childbirth) and delivery
  Complicated delivery/labor, unspec.

Complications of the puerperium (670–677)
  Major puerperal infection
  Endometritis, postpartum
  Venous complications in pregnancy and the puerperium
  Thrombophlebitis, postpartum
  Pyrexia of unknown origin during the puerperium
  Obstetrical pulmonary embolism
  Other and unspecified complications of the puerperium, not elsewhere
  Infections of the breast and nipple associated with childbirth
  Abscess of breast, postpartum
  Mastitis, lactating, unspec., postpartum
  Other disorders of the breast associated with childbirth
  Engorgement of breasts, postpartum
  Late effect of complication of pregnancy, childbirth, and the puerperium

Other maternal and fetal complications (678–679)
  Other fetal conditions
  Fetal hematologic conditions
  Fetal conjoined twins
  Complications of in utero procedures

International Classification of Diseases